Adam Sedgwick FRS (28 September 1854 – 27 February 1913) was a British zoologist and Professor of Zoology and Comparative Anatomy, Imperial College, London, and a great nephew of the renowned geologist Adam Sedgwick.

Sedgwick was born in Norwich, Norfolk in 1854, the son of Rev Richard Sedgwick, vicar of Dent, Yorkshire and his wife Mary Jane, daughter of John Woodhouse of Bolton-le-Moors, Lancashire.  He was the great-nephew of Rev. Adam Sedgwick (FRS 1821). He married Laura, daughter of Captain Robinson of Armagh.

He was educated at Giggleswick School; Marlborough College; King's College London; and later at Trinity College, Cambridge, where he was awarded his BA in 1878, and awarded MA  in 1881.  Fellow of Trinity College, Cambridge (1880); tutor, Trinity College (1897–1907); lecturer in animal morphology, Cambridge University (1883–1890); reader in animal morphology (1890–1907); professor of zoology and comparative anatomy (1907–1909); professor of zoology, Imperial College, London (1909–1913); chairman, Geological Survey of Great Britain.  He was elected a fellow of the Royal Society in 1886.

Sedgwick contributed articles to the 1911 edition of the Encyclopædia Britannica. He also wrote “A Student's Textbook of Zoology” in three volumes, published in 1898, 1905 and 1909. He was a member of the Athenaeum Club.

References

External links 

 

1854 births
1913 deaths
People educated at Giggleswick School
People educated at Marlborough College
Alumni of King's College London
Alumni of Trinity College, Cambridge
Fellows of the Royal Society
British zoologists
Professors of Zoology (Cambridge, 1866)